The United Arab Emirates competed at the 2018 Asian Games in Jakarta and Palembang, Indonesia, from 18 August to 2 September 2018. The United Arab Emirates National Olympic Committee announced a delegation of 217 members for the Games, with 138 athletes represented the country across 23 sports.

Medalists

The following United Arab Emirates competitors won medals at the Games.

|  style="text-align:left; width:78%; vertical-align:top;"|

|  style="text-align:left; width:22%; vertical-align:top;"|

Competitors 
Following is a list of the numbers of competitors who represented the United Arab Emirates at the Games:

Archery 

Recurve

Athletics 

The UAE entered five athletes (3 men's and 2 women's) to participate in the athletics competition at the Games.

Basketball 

The UAE NOC announced that a men's team will compete at the 5x5 basketball competition.

Boxing 

Men

Cycling

Road

Track

Pursuit

Qualification legend: FA=Gold medal final; FB=Bronze medal final

Omnium

Madison

Equestrian 

Jumping

# – indicates that the score of this rider does not count in the team competition, since only the best three results of a team are counted.

Fencing 

Individual

Football 

Summary

Men's tournament

The draw for the men's football event was held on 5 July 2018 initially with involving 24 teams. The teams seeded into four pots with six teams each classified in those pots. However the initial draw was scratched due to the omission of both UAE and Palestine due to the by mistakes of the game organisers. It was earlier proved that both of the football associations of Palestine and United Arab Emirates correctly submitted their participation form on time before the deadline. Due to these errors, the tournament's draw result was rescheduled and reconfirmed on 25 July 2018 with Palestine added to the Group A alongside hosts Indonesia and UAE was added to Group E.

However another redraw was held again for the men's football team event on 3 August 2018 due to the sudden withdrawal of Iraq national football team and it was decided to move either UAE or Palestine to Group C.

Roster

Group C

Round of 16

Quarter-final

Semi-final

Bronze medal match

Golf 

UAE Golf Federation represented by two young golfers (1 men's and 1 women's) who competed in the individual event.

Jet ski 

UAE entered six jet skiers at the Games. Ali Al-Lanjawi claimed a gold and a silver for the contingent in the runabout limited and endurance open respectively.

Ju-jitsu 

UAE entered 15 athletes (11 men's and 4 women's) to make their debut at the Asian Games. The UAE team topped the ju-jitsu medals table with two golds, 5 silvers and 2 bronzes.

Men

Women

Judo 

Men

Karate 

UAE participated in the karate competition at the Games with three athletes (2 men's and 1 women).

Rowing 

Men

Rugby Sevens 

United Arab Emirates men's team participated in the Games in Group C of the tournament along with Afghanistan, Sri Lanka and South Korea. This is for the first time for the UAE to compete in the rugby sevens at the Asian Games.

Men's tournament

Squad
The following is the United Arab Emirates squad in the men's rugby sevens tournament of the 2018 Asian Games.

Head coach:  Apolosefulutasi Perelini

Saeed Ibrahim Abdulla Saad
Mohamed Saeed Al-Shamsi
Rashed Saqer Al-Marzooqi
Yousuf Lashkri Mohhammad
Hassan Ali Al-Noobi
Majid Mohammed Al-Balooshi
Abdalla Rabee Salmin
Ali Matar Al-Sereidi
Walid Salem Al-Balooshi
Ahmed Mohammed Al-Areefi
Ahmad Moosa Al-Shehi

Group C

Classification round (9–12)

Sailing 

Men

Mixed

Shooting 

Men

Women

Mixed team

Table tennis 

Individual

Team

Taekwondo 

Kyorugi

Triathlon 

Individual

Weightlifting

UAE prepared two weightlifters (1 men and 1 women) to compete at the Games. Issa Al Balushi was eliminated from the Games because he did not show up at the weigh-in.

Women

References

Nations at the 2018 Asian Games
2018
Asian Games